Summer Festival is a Canadian current affairs and entertainment television series which aired on CBC Television in 1980.

Premise
This series featured various events throughout Canada such as a lobster festival in Prince Edward Island or Edmonton's Klondike Days. Various series hosts were assigned for each Canadian region. On Monday episodes, Geoff Gray-Cobb of British Columbia provided astrology advice.

Summer Festival replaced The Bob McLean Show between June and September 1980.

Regional hosts
 Edmonton: Jo Green
 Halifax: Beth Harrington
 Charlottetown: Amanda Hancox
 St. John's, Newfoundland: Shirley Newhook
 Toronto: Riki Turofsky
 Windsor, Ontario: Marilyn MacKay
 Winnipeg: Arvel Gray
 Vancouver: Debra Kaye

Scheduling
This hour-long series was broadcast weekdays at 3:00 p.m. (Eastern time) from 30 June to 5 September 1980.

References

External links
 

CBC Television original programming
1980 Canadian television series debuts
1980 Canadian television series endings
Television shows filmed in Edmonton
Television shows filmed in Halifax, Nova Scotia
Television shows filmed in St. John's, Newfoundland and Labrador
Television shows filmed in Toronto
Television shows filmed in Vancouver
Television shows filmed in Windsor, Ontario
Television shows filmed in Winnipeg
Television shows filmed in Prince Edward Island
Culture of Charlottetown
1980s Canadian documentary television series